Ranjit Singh Ahir (also known as Ranjit Ram) was one of the commander of rebel army in the Indian rebellion of 1857 in Bihar, he fought against British East India Company under the leadership of Kunwar Singh. He belonged to Zamindar family of Krishnaut Bihari Ahir (Yadav) of Shahpur-Bihiya Pargana, currently part of Bhojpur district, Bihar.

Early life
Ranjit Singh Ahir was born in 1802 to a Zamindar Krishnaut Ahir family of Shahpur village of Bihiya Pargana in Bhojpur district. His father's name was Parsanram Singh Ahir.

Since an early age, Ranjit Singh Ahir was working for the British East India Company, he was a Havildar in the first company of the 40th Platoon, his job was to distribute salaries to the soldiers.

Role in the 1857 rebellion
On 25 July 1857, the sepoys revolted in Danapur, they looted weapons from Danapur and marched off towards Arrah. 

The rebel soldiers first captured the Koilvar bridge and then marched to Arrah and joined famous rebel leader Kunwar Singh.

See also
Kunwar Singh
Siege of Arrah

References

Revolutionaries of the Indian Rebellion of 1857
People from Bhojpur district, India
History of Bihar
Indian independence activists from Bihar
Ahir
Bihari Ahirs